The electromagnetism uniqueness theorem states the uniqueness (but not necessarily the existence) of a solution to Maxwell's equations, if the boundary conditions provided satisfy the following requirements:

 At , the initial values of all fields (and ) everywhere (in the entire volume considered) is specified;

Note that this theorem must not be misunderstood as that providing boundary conditions (or the field solution itself) uniquely fixes a source distribution, when the source distribution is outside of the volume specified in the initial condition. One example is that the field outside a uniformly charged sphere may also be produced by a point charge placed at the center of the sphere instead, i.e. the source needed to produce such field at a boundary outside the sphere is not unique.

See also
Maxwell's equations
Green's function
Surface equivalence principle
Uniqueness theorem

References

Specific

Vector calculus
Physics theorems
Uniqueness theorems